Valen is a tiny hamlet in Vadsø Municipality in Troms og Finnmark county, Norway. It is located at the mainland end of the narrow isthmus of land which joins the small Ekkerøy peninsula to the mainland Varanger Peninsula. The bay on the northeastern side of the isthmus is called Yttersida and that on the southwestern side is called Innersida.

References

Villages in Finnmark
Vadsø
Populated places of Arctic Norway